
Ghosts of Dead Aeroplanes is the fourth album by the band Prolapse, released in May 1999 on Cooking Vinyl Records in the UK. The album was again produced by Donald Ross Skinner, who was now a fully fledged member of the band.

The album was originally released on 12” vinyl and CD by Cooking Vinyl Records in the UK, and on CD by Jetset Records in the US.

Track listing
All songs written by Prolapse

Personnel

Band
 Mick Derrick - vocals, stylophone
 Mick Harrison - bass, guitar
 David Jeffreys - guitar, vocals
 Pat Marsden - guitar, keyboards
 Tim Pattinson - drums
 Linda Steelyard - vocals, keyboard, recorder
 Donald Ross Skinner - guitar

Production
 Produced by Donald Ross Skinner

References

1999 albums
Prolapse (band) albums